Yawhen Wladzimiravich Linyow (born 27 October 1980) is a Belarusian professional football coach and former player. As of 2015, he is a manager for Kletsk.

External links

Profile on Official Tavriya Website
Profile on Football Squads

1980 births
Living people
Belarusian footballers
Association football defenders
Belarusian expatriate footballers
Expatriate footballers in Ukraine
Belarusian expatriate sportspeople in Ukraine
Ukrainian Premier League players
FC Torpedo Minsk players
FC SKVICH Minsk players
FC Metalurh Zaporizhzhia players
SC Tavriya Simferopol players
FC Gomel players